The FIRST LEGO League Challenge (formerly known as FIRST LEGO League) is an international competition organized by FIRST for elementary and middle school students (ages 9–14 in the United States and Canada, 9–16 elsewhere).

Each year in August, FIRST LEGO League Challenge teams are introduced to a scientific and real-world challenge for teams to focus and research on. The robotics part of the competition involves designing and programming Lego Education robots to complete tasks. The students work out a solution to a problem related to the theme (changes every year) and then meet for regional, national and international tournaments to compete, share their knowledge, compare ideas, and display their robots.

The FIRST LEGO League Challenge is a partnership between FIRST and the LEGO Group. It is the third division of FIRST LEGO League, following FIRST LEGO League Discover for ages 4-6, and FIRST Lego League Explore for ages 6-10.

Competition details

At the beginning of the competition season, FIRST sends a set of  official competition materials to each registered team, consisting of a 'challenge mat', LEGO electronic and mechanical components, and instructions for building the items for the mat (collectively known as the Challenge Set, formerly the Field Setup Kit). The teams also receive a list of tasks, called 'missions', to complete involving each model on the mat (e.g. taking a loose piece from one model and placing it inside another). The FIRST LEGO League Challenge gives teams complete freedom on how to complete the missions, providing that they are completed by a programmed LEGO Education robot with no outside assistance. The robot has two and a half minutes to complete the missions; called the Robot Game. Each team has a minimum build period of 8 weeks to analyze the challenge mat, design and build a LEGO Education robot, and program it to fulfill the given missions in any manner they see fit. The robot must be autonomous, and may contain only one LEGO Education programmable block and no more than four motors.

In addition to the live robot run, or Robot Game, the competition has three additional judged sections with the purpose of providing teams with feedback on their achievement of the FIRST LEGO League Challenge learning objectives. The first judging session, Core Values, is designed to determine how the team works together and uses the FIRST LEGO League Core Values in everything they do, which include inspiration, teamwork, Gracious Professionalism, and Coopertition. In addition to discussing how their team exhibits these values, teams may also be asked to perform a teamwork activity, usually timed, to see how the team works together to solve a new problem. Secondly, in the Robot Design, or technical judging, the team demonstrates the mechanical design, programming, and strategy/innovation of their robot. The goal of this judging session is to see what the robot “should” do during the Robot Game. Thirdly, in the Project, the students must give a 5-minute presentation on the research of a topic related to the current challenge. The required steps of the project as teams to first identify a problem that is related to the topic of that year's competition, then create an innovative solution to their identified problem by modifying something that already exists or creating something completely new (an "innovative solution"), and then they must share that solution with others, such as real-world professionals who have expertise in the annual challenge theme.

Table performance

When the official competition convenes, each team brings their robot to compete on an official challenge mat identical to their own.  Two team members are allowed at the board during a match; however, they can switch out with others in the team.  In the case of a serious problem, such as the entire robot breaking down, the entire team is allowed at the board for as long as the problem persists.  Members are not permitted to bring additional robots or any other items to the board during the competition.

The robot starts in an area marked as 'base', a white area in the corner or to one side of the table.  While at base, two team members are allowed to touch the robot and start programs.  If the team touches the robot outside of base (an 'interruption'), the referee will issue a penalty, resulting in the removal of a Precision Token. These are stationary LEGO models that increase the final score if they remain until the end, providing an incentive to not interrupt the robot.  The robot is not required to return to base; some teams have completed all their missions without returning to base during the time allowed to complete the missions.  In fact, in the 2008–09, 2009–10, 2011-13 and 2021 challenges, points were awarded if the robot was in one of two specified areas, not including base, at the end of the two and a half minute match.

Parts and Robotic platforms

FIRST LEGO League Challenge teams may use "any LEGO-made building parts in their original factory condition" to construct their robots. The robots are programmed using any language allowing autonomous movement. Many teams opt for a block-based programming environment such as the official EV3 software, the official NXT-G software (now outdated), or Robolab. All these are built around Labview.

The robots used are Lego Education units. Until 2021, the platform of choice was the Lego Mindstorm EV3. While the EV3 will still be permitted in FLL competitions, starting in August 2022, the Guided Mission will only be available for SPIKE Prime.

Events
Teams in different parts of the world have different times allotted to complete the construction of the robot due to the varying date of qualifying tournaments but must have a minimum of 8 weeks from "Global Challenge Release" (the date, usually in August, by which the details of the missions and research project become available to the public). They go on to compete in FIRST LEGO League Challenge tournaments, similar to the FIRST Robotics Competition regionals. The initial levels of competition are managed by an Affiliate Partner Organization (commonly affiliated Universities), who are led by an Affiliate or Operational Partner Representative ("The Partner"). The Partner has complete control over all official tournaments in their region. Region boundaries are set by FIRST. Some States represent an entire region, while others, like Central Florida, represent a mix of Counties within the State. Most Partners have a two-tier system; teams first go to a "Qualifier", and if they meet certain criteria and perform well in all three judged areas, they can receive a bid to advance to the next level of competition, which is most often a Regional-Level event. Certain territories have 3-tiers and may also employ a State Championship.

The largest single-day regional qualifying tournament is hosted by First State Robotics and First State FIRST LEGO League in Wilmington, Delaware. Taking place every January, this event holds FIRST LEGO League Explore, FIRST LEGO League Challenge, FIRST Tech Challenge, FIRST Robotics Competition, and robot sumo competitions under one roof at the University of Delaware's Bob Carpenter Center.  Teams from Eastern Pennsylvania, Southern New Jersey, Delaware, and Maryland (among other regions) attend this tournament to make it the largest single-day FIRST event in the world.

FIRST Championship 
The only competition run by FIRST is the FIRST Championship In 2007, 96 teams competed in the FIRST LEGO League World Festival in Atlanta, Georgia on April 27–30. The 2007–08 Power Puzzle FIRST LEGO League World Festival and the 2008–09 FIRST LEGO League World Festival on Climate Connections were held again in the Georgia Dome and Georgia World Congress Center. Starting with 2010–11, FIRST LEGO League World Festival is held at the Edward Jones Dome and America's Center in St. Louis. In 2016, FIRST announced that they were expanding the FIRST Championship to two back-to-back events. Through 2020, these events will be held first in Houston, Texas at the George R. Brown Convention Center and the following week in Detroit, Michigan at the Cobo Center.

Additionally, top-performing teams from the highest level of regional/state competition may be nominated to participate in one of the Open Championships (also called "Invitationals"), which are organized by FIRST LEGO League Challenge Partners. 
With the exception of Local Awards (a special recognition designed by that region's Partner), the Rookie Award, which recognizes a team for whose this is their first year competing and displayed extraordinary achievements, the Judges Award, which recognizes a team that displays much achievement, but did not qualify for any typical award, and the Robot Performance Award, which recognizes the team with the single highest numeric robot performance score at that particular event, teams are only allowed to win one award at any particular event.

Global Innovation Award 

Officially registered teams can also be nominated by their region for the Global Innovation Award, where they could win a grant to make their innovative solution to the annual challenge theme's problem a reality. As of the Animal Allies Season, the First Place team wins $20,000 and two other Finalists each win $5,000. The money can be used to further the team's ideas or to continue in FIRST programs. All three finalist teams also receive a LEGO Mindstorms Education EV3 Robot Set. All submissions are reviewed by a panel of judges consisting of experts from engineering and industrial fields as well as experts in the challenge theme for that year. Teams are judged on problem identification, innovation, implementation, and effective use of STEM principles. From all of the teams nominated by every FIRST LEGO League Challenge region, twenty teams are selected as semi-finalists and are invited to attend the Global Innovation Award Celebration in San Jose (formerly in Washington, D.C.) At this event, the teams present to a panel of judges, and the first place and other finalist teams winning the cash prizes are announced.

Challenges
The challenges for the FIRST LEGO League Challenge are annually themed based on a real world problem:

See also 
 RoboCup Junior
 LEGO Robotics

Notes

External links 

 
 Official FIRST website
 FLL-Freak Website and home of the FLL UFAQ
FLL Open Asian Championship website
USFIRST.org/What FLL is
USFIRST.org/FLL community
Hands on Technology/FLL
HighTechKids.org
First State Robotics website
First State FIRST LEGO League website
Animal Allies Teaser

For Inspiration and Recognition of Science and Technology

Recurring events established in 1999
Lego